The 2016–17 Dandenong Rangers season was the 25th season for the franchise in the Women's National Basketball League (WNBL). The Rangers finished the regular season with a 15–9 record, securing the 2nd seed going into the finals. After defeating the Perth Lynx 2–1 in the Semi-finals, they then faced the Sydney Uni Flames in the Grand Final series where they lost the series 0–2.

Roster

Standings

Results

Regular season

Finals

Semifinals

Grand Final

Awards

In-season

References

External links
Dandenong Rangers Official website

2016–17 WNBL season
WNBL seasons by team
2016–17 in Australian basketball
Basketball,Dandenong Rangers
Basketball,Dandenong Rangers